Abel Enrique Aguilar Tapias (born 6 January 1985) is a Colombian former footballer who played as a central or defensive midfielder.

Having started his career at Deportivo Cali, Aguilar signed with Italian club Udinese at the age of 20 then spent seven seasons in Spanish football with four teams, appearing in La Liga for Zaragoza, Hércules and Deportivo. He also competed professionally in France, Portugal and the United States.

A Colombian international since 2004, Aguilar represented the nation in two World Cups and as many Copa América tournaments while playing 71 matches.

Club career

Italy
Aguilar was born in Bogotá. Serie A club Udinese Calcio bought his rights in the summer of 2005, from local Deportivo Cali, and loaned him immediately to fellow league team Ascoli Calcio 1898 due to the excess of foreign players in the roster; however, after some problems in the arrival of the transfer, the player missed pre-season training, only joining it a month into the season.

Aguilar returned to Udinese in January 2006, after having never played for Ascoli, but received few playing opportunities in the following months (two league matches and the UEFA Cup 0–1 loss at RC Lens, all incomplete).

Spain
For the following three years, Aguilar was also loaned, always in the Spanish second division. He started out in January 2007 at Xerez CD, where he remained until the end of the 2007–08 campaign, always as first choice.

In 2008–09, Aguilar represented Hércules CF, being a permanent fixture as the Alicante side fell three points short of a return to La Liga. On 24 July 2009 he was again loaned, now to Real Zaragoza, which in turn promoted to the top flight; he made his debut in the competition on 29 August, starting and playing 71 minutes in a 1–0 home win against CD Tenerife, and scored all his four league goals during the first two months of competition.

Aguilar was released by Udinese in July 2010, immediately signing a four-year contract with former club Hércules, returned to the top division after an absence of 13 years. He appeared in 34 scoreless games during the season, which ended in relegation.

Aguilar returned to the Spanish top tier in the 2012–13 campaign, being loaned to Deportivo de La Coruña. He netted twice in just his second league appearance to help to a 3–3 draw at Valencia CF, but his team was again eventually relegated.

Toulouse
On 22 August 2013, Aguilar agreed to a three-year deal with Toulouse FC. His maiden appearance in Ligue 1 occurred nine days later, putting on an average performance and being booked in a 1–2 away loss to SC Bastia.

Aguilar spent his third year in France on the sidelines, nursing a serious ankle injury. In the very last moments of the 2016 January transfer window, he joined C.F. Os Belenenses from Portugal.

Return home
On 12 June 2016, after 11 years playing in Europe, Aguilar returned to his country and Deportivo Cali, signing a three-year contract. He scored his first goal for the team on 29 July, in the 2–1 victory against América de Cali for the Copa Colombia.

FC Dallas
On 27 August 2018, Aguilar joined Major League Soccer side FC Dallas. At the end of the season, he was released.

Unión Magdalena
Aged 33, Aguilar returned to his country in December 2018, agreeing to a deal at Unión Magdalena for the upcoming season. On 18 February 2020, he announced his retirement.

International career
Aguilar was the captain of the Colombia national U-17 team and U-20 levels. He rose to stardom as leader of the latter side that finished third at the 2003 FIFA World Youth Championship.

Aguilar was then promoted to the senior squad for the 2004 Copa América held in Peru. There, he scored two goals, helping his country to the semi-finals.

Subsequently, Aguilar returned to the under-20 (again as captain), helping them to a first-place finish at the 2005 South American Youth Cup with the consequent qualification for the World Championship of the category in the Netherlands. After helping the national team to three group stage wins, he could not prevent a round-of-16 1–2 ousting at the ends of Argentina.

Aguilar was selected by José Pekerman for his 2014 FIFA World Cup squad. He played his first-ever game in the tournament on 14 June, starting in a 3–0 group stage win against Greece which was also his 50th cap.

Aguilar was also picked for the 2018 World Cup in Russia.

Career statistics

International

(Colombia score listed first, score column indicates score after each Aguilar goal)

References

External links

1985 births
Living people
Footballers from Bogotá
Colombian footballers
Association football midfielders
Categoría Primera A players
Deportivo Cali footballers
Unión Magdalena footballers
Serie A players
Udinese Calcio players
Ascoli Calcio 1898 F.C. players
La Liga players
Segunda División players
Xerez CD footballers
Hércules CF players
Real Zaragoza players
Deportivo de La Coruña players
Ligue 1 players
Toulouse FC players
Primeira Liga players
C.F. Os Belenenses players
Major League Soccer players
FC Dallas players
Colombia under-20 international footballers
Colombia international footballers
2004 Copa América players
2005 CONCACAF Gold Cup players
2011 Copa América players
2014 FIFA World Cup players
2018 FIFA World Cup players
Colombian expatriate footballers
Expatriate footballers in Italy
Expatriate footballers in Spain
Expatriate footballers in France
Expatriate footballers in Portugal
Expatriate soccer players in the United States
Colombian expatriate sportspeople in Italy
Colombian expatriate sportspeople in Spain
Colombian expatriate sportspeople in France
Colombian expatriate sportspeople in Portugal
Colombian expatriate sportspeople in the United States